William Tucker may refer to:

 William Tooker or Tucker (1557/58–1621), English churchman
 William Tucker (musician) (1961–1999), guitar player
 William Tucker (politician) (1843–1919), member of the New Zealand Legislative Council
 William Tucker (priest) (1856–1934), Anglican archdeacon and dean
 William Tucker (settler) (1784–1817), convict, sealer, trader in human heads, Otago settler, New Zealand's first art dealer
 William Eldon Tucker (1872–1953), England international rugby union player
 William F. Tucker (1827–1881), Confederate States Army brigadier general
 William G. Tucker (born 1935), modernist British sculptor 
 William H. Tucker (psychologist) (born 1940), professor of psychology
 William Sansome Tucker (1877–1955), English physicist known for his sound mirrors
 Bill Tucker (American football) (1942–2015), American football player
 Bill Tucker (rugby union) (1903–1991), England international rugby union player
 William Ellis Tucker (died 1832), American porcelain manufacturer
 William Jewett Tucker (1839–1926), president of Dartmouth College
 William H. Tucker (baseball) (1819–1894), American baseball pioneer
 William Tucker (Jamestown immigrant) (1588–1643/44), settled in Jamestown of the Colony of Virginia
 William Tucker (Virginia colony) (1624–?), born to two of the first Africans in Virginia